Beaulieu is a French surname. Notable people with the surname include:

Art
Antoine de Beaulieu (died 1663), French ballet dancer and noble
Bradley Beaulieu, American author
Christine Beaulieu, Canadian actress and playwright
Claire Beaulieu (born 1955), Canadian artist
Corey Beaulieu (born 1983), American musician
Derek Beaulieu (born 1973), Canadian poet, writer and publisher
Désiré Beaulieu (1791–1863), French composer
Eustorg de Beaulieu (c. 1495–1552), French poet, composer and pastor
Geneviève Brossard de Beaulieu (fl. c. 1770–1815), French painter
Geoffrey of Beaulieu (fl. 13th century), French monk and biographer
Germaine Beaulieu (born 1949), Canadian poet and novelist
Girard de Beaulieu (died after 1587), French singer, musician and composer
Henri Beaulieu (1873–1953), French actor, theatre director and author
Joseph Beaulieu (1895–1965), Canadian composer, folklorist and educator
Marie-Hélène Beaulieu (born 1979), Canadian artist
Michel Beaulieu (1941–1985), Canadian writer and poet
Philippe Leroy-Beaulieu (born 1930), French actor
Philippine Leroy-Beaulieu (born 1963), French actress
Priscilla Beaulieu Presley (born 1945), American actress, businesswoman and ex-wife of Elvis Presley
Renée Beaulieu, Canadian director and screenwriter
Trace Beaulieu (born 1958), American comedian, puppeteer, writer and actor
Victor-Lévy Beaulieu (born 1945), Canadian writer, playwright and editor

Politics
Antoine Treuille de Beaulieu (1809–1885), French general
Augustin de Beaulieu (1589–1637), French general
Bernard Thomas Tréhouart de Beaulieu (1754–1804), French businessman, naval officer and politician
Catherine Beaulieu Bouvier Lamoureux (c. 1820–1918), Métis leader
Edward Douglas-Scott-Montagu, 3rd Baron Montagu of Beaulieu (1926–2015), British politician and peer
Emile Beaulieu (1931–2016), American politician
François Beaulieu II (1771–1872), Métis guide, interpreter and chief of the Yellowknives
Hubert Le Loup de Beaulieu (died 1799), French naval officer
Jane Beaulieu, American politician
Jean-Claude Beaulieu (born 1944), French politician
Jean-Paul Beaulieu (1902–1976), Canadian politician and accountant
Johann Peter de Beaulieu (1725–1819), Austrian general
Mario Beaulieu (born 1959), Canadian politician and former party leader of the Bloc Quebecois
Mario Beaulieu (senator) (1930–1998), Canadian politician and notary
Martin Ruzé de Beaulieu (c. 1526–1613), French politician and noble
Paul André Beaulieu, Canadian diplomat
Roland Beaulieu (born 1944), Canadian politician
Tom Beaulieu (born 1958), Canadian politician

Sports
Alex Beaulieu-Marchand (born 1994), Canadian freestyle skier
André Beaulieu (born 1940), Canadian ice hockey player and coach
Anne-Julie Beaulieu (born 1994), Canadian badminton player
Antoine Gélinas-Beaulieu (born 1992), Canadian speed skater
Jacques Beaulieu (ice hockey) (born 1968), Canadian ice hockey player
Jason Beaulieu (born 1994), Canadian soccer player
Jean-Christophe Beaulieu (born 1990), Canadian football player
Jonathan Beaulieu (born 1993), French footballer
Jonathan Beaulieu-Bourgault (born 1988), Canadian soccer player
Jonathan Beaulieu-Richard (born 1988), Canadian football player
Mélissa Citrini-Beaulieu (born 1995), Canadian diver
Nathan Beaulieu (born 1992), Canadian ice hockey player

Other
Henri Leroy-Beaulieu (1842–1912), French publicist and historian
Hugh of Beaulieu (died 1223), English bishop
Jacques Beaulieu (born 1932), Canadian physicist
Louis Beaulieu (1840–1866), French missionary and Roman Catholic martyr
Luke de Beaulieu (died 1723), Anglo–French Huguenot exile and cleric
Norman C. Beaulieu (born 1958), Canadian engineer and academic
Olivier Freiherr von Beaulieu-Marconnay (1898–1918), German World War One flying ace
Paul-Alain Beaulieu, Canadian historian and academic
Pierre Paul Leroy-Beaulieu (1843–1916), French economist
Sébastien Pontault de Beaulieu (1612–1674), French engineer and topographer

See also
 Beaulieu (disambiguation)
 Bewley (disambiguation)

French-language surnames